Muskurati Morning is a TV show hosted by Faysal Qureshi and Ayesha Khalid. It seeks to entertain, educate and expresses the voice of Pakistani woman.

Synopsis
The show discusses health issues, fitness advice, legal problems and relationship hiccups. Herbalist Abdul Ghaffar Agha offers tips and possible cures, dermatologist Dr. Khurram Shahzad discusses skin care and beautician Gul-e-Rana offers personal aesthetic advice.

Kismat Connection shows couples discussing their lives. Pop Korn discusses movies and celebrity gossip. Silver Screen' discusses Pakistani cinema.  Be My Guest discusses celebrities. Public Opinion'' allows viewers to ask questions of experts or request a makeover.

External links

Muskurati Morning on TVOne Global
Shes on One with Faisal Qureshi
Ayesha Khalid Muskurati Morning 

Pakistani television talk shows